Tribute to the Lady is the third studio album by American singer-songwriter Sam Cooke, released in 1959. It was recorded in tribute to jazz vocalist Billie Holiday, who died later that year. The backing band is the René Hall Orchestra.

Track listing

Side one 
 "God Bless the Child" (Arthur Herzog, Jr.) – 2:32
 "She's Funny That Way" (Charles N. Daniels, Richard A. Whiting) – 1:49
 "I've Got a Right to Sing the Blues" (Harold Arlen, Ted Koehler) – 2:31
 "Good Morning Heartache" (Dan Fisher, Ervin Drake, Irene Higginbotham) – 2:06
 "'T'aint Nobody's Bizness (If I Do)" (Porter Grainger, Everett Robbins) – 2:23
 "Comes Love" (Lew Brown, Sam H. Stept, Charles Tobias) – 2:38

Side two 
 "Lover Girl (Man)" (Jimmy Davis, Roger "Ram" Ramirez, James Sherman) – 2:25
 "Let's Call the Whole Thing Off" (George Gershwin, Ira Gershwin) – 2:19
 "Lover Come Back to Me" (Sigmund Romberg, Oscar Hammerstein II) – 2:10
 "Solitude" (Duke Ellington, Eddie DeLange, Irving Mills) – 2:22
 "They Can't Take That Away from Me" (George Gershwin, Ira Gershwin) – 2:28
 "Crazy in Love With You" (Brook Benton, Clyde Otis) – 2:33

Notes 

The album was recorded in January & February 1959 in Los Angeles.

External links 
 Songs of Sam Cooke: Main Page
 Songs of Sam Cooke: Tribute to the Lady

1959 albums
Sam Cooke albums
Albums produced by Hugo & Luigi
Keen Records albums
Billie Holiday tribute albums